Rezaul Karim Bablu (born 13 November 1962) is a Bangladeshi politician and the incumbent Jatiya Sangsad member representing the Bogra-7 constituency.

Early life and career 
Bablu earned his H.S.C. degree.

Bablu was elected to the parliament from Bogra-7 as an independent candidate, endorsed by Bangladesh Nationalist Party, on 30 December 2018.

Controversy
In November 2020, on the Women and Children Repression Prevention (Amendment) Bill discussion, Bablu blamed the feminists for the increase in rape incidents around Bangladesh.

References

Living people
1962 births
People from Bogra District
11th Jatiya Sangsad members
Place of birth missing (living people)